Mark Trewella (born 28 June 1966) is a former Australian rules footballer who played with Fitzroy and Richmond in the Victorian/Australian Football League (VFL/AFL).

Trewella, who was from Doncaster originally, started out at Fitzroy in the Under 19s. He won three reserves best and fairest awards for Fitzroy and was a member of their reserves premiership team in 1989. After playing 23 senior games for Fitzroy, Trewella made his way to Richmond, via the 1991 Pre-Season Draft. He made four appearances for Richmond, all in the 1991 AFL season. He later played in the Victorian Football Association for both Prahran and Box Hill.

References

1966 births
Australian rules footballers from Victoria (Australia)
Fitzroy Football Club players
Richmond Football Club players
Prahran Football Club players
Box Hill Football Club players
Living people